Tom Easterly (April 21, 1940 – June 15, 2005) was an American politician. He served as a Democratic member for the Kentucky Senate. Easterly also served as a member for the 118th district of the Florida House of Representatives.

Born in Columbus, Ohio, the son of Ethel and Edgar E. Easterly. Easterly attended at the Eastern High School, later graduating in 1958. He then attended at the Carleton College, where he played baseball and football, in which Easterly graduated with his Latin honors and the honor society Phi Beta Kappa. He moved to Paris for at least a year. Easterly attended at the University of Kentucky, where he earned his master's degree. He also earned Bronze Star Medal during his service in the United States Army. Easterly had taught the language French and also attended at the University of Tennessee, where he learned about law. He taught at the Kentucky State University, where he taught about the languages German and Spanish. Easterly also taught about the administrator law.

Easterly served as state senator for the Kentucky Senate from 1974 to 1981. He had lost elections of the United States House of Representatives for the 6th's district of Kentucky, in which Larry J. Hopkins had defeated him. Easterly was documented licensed to experience law in Kentucky for which he then served as a lawyer until 1987. In 1985, he moved to Miami, Florida. In 1988, Easterly won the election for the 118th district of the Florida House of Representatives. He succeeded Robert J. Starks. In 1990, Easterly was succeeded by Daryl Jones for the 118th district. He moved to Beckley, West Virginia in 2000. Easterly once defeated John B. Breckinridge in an election.

Easterly died in June 2005 of a traffic collision in Hurricane, West Virginia, at the age of 55.

References 

1940 births
2005 deaths
Politicians from Columbus, Ohio
Democratic Party members of the Florida House of Representatives
Kentucky lawyers
Kentucky state senators
20th-century American politicians
20th-century American lawyers
Carleton College alumni
University of Kentucky alumni
University of Tennessee alumni
University of Tennessee faculty
American emigrants to France
Road incident deaths in West Virginia